Midnight forests was a nickname given to the forests created by President of the United States Theodore Roosevelt near the end of his term as president.

In early 1891, Congress was reconsidering provisions in the nation's land laws. An amendment (Section 24) attached to the legislation would allow the President of the United States to set aside forest reserves from the land in the public domain. The act, signed on March 3, 1891, was later referred to as the Creative Act, or the Forest Reserve Act.

Due to complaints from many special interest groups, ranging from cattlemen to loggers to sheepmen and homesteaders, over the myriad regulations required for operations in forest reserve lands, they, together with their political allies, managed to get enough support in Congress by 1907 to change the 1891 law.

Senator Charles W. Fulton, Republican of Oregon, attached an amendment to the Agriculture Appropriations Act of 1907, which stated, "Hereafter no forest reserve shall be created, nor shall any addition be made to one heretofore created, within the limits of the States of Oregon, Washington, Idaho, Montana, Colorado or Wyoming." The amendment also changed the name of the forest reserves to national forests, in order to make it clear that the forests were to be used, not preserved. The bill passed on February 25, 1907, and was sent to the President for his signature.

Roosevelt had no way of vetoing the Agriculture Appropriations Act the amendment was attached to without gaining more political enemies, and therefore had to sign it into law by noon on March 4, 1907. The president spent the next few days consulting with Gifford Pinchot, head of the U.S. Forest Service, about the areas to designate as national forest reserves. After having done so, Roosevelt then signed the Agricultural Appropriations Act, which included the now-irrelevant amendment.

Because of the nature of the timing of the proclamations, and from President Roosevelt`s own comment, these forest preserves/national forests created in March of 1907 are sometimes referred to as the "midnight forests".

References

Further reading
 Hines, Gary. (2005). Midnight Forests: A Story Of Gifford Pinchot And Our National Forests. 
 McCarthy, Michael. (1992). The First Sagebrush Rebellion: Forest Reserves and States Rights in Colorado and the West, 1891-1907
 Morris, Edmund. (2001). Theodore Rex. 
 Rakestraw, Lawrence. (1973). A History of Forest Conservation in the Pacific Northwest 1891-1913
 Williams, Gerald W. (2009). The U.S. Forest Service in the Pacific Northwest: A History
 Williams, Gerald W. and Mark, Stephen R. (1995). Establishing and Defending the Cascade Range Forest Reserve from 1885 to 1912

Forests of the United States
United States federal public land legislation
Forest reserves